Maripur or Mauripur is a village to the west of Karachi, Pakistan, near Hawke's Bay Beach.

Air Force Base 
PAF Base Masroor  is the largest airbase operated by the Pakistan Air Force. It is located in the Mauripur area of Karachi, in the Sindh province. The base was originally known as RPAF Station Mauripur and after 1956, as PAF Station Mauripur. It is of immense strategic importance considering it has been entrusted upon the task of defending the coastal and Southern region of Pakistan. It houses the 32 Tactical Attack (TA) Wing which comprises four separate squadrons.

Transportation
Karachi Transport Ittehad (KTI) bus route between Mauripur and rest of Karachi downtown, Saddar. The buses also run between Gulshan-e-Hadeed and Maripur. Makran Coastal Highway is a 653 km-long coastal highway along Pakistan's Arabian Sea coastline. It is a part of Pakistan's National Highways network. It runs primarily through Balochistan province between Karachi and Gwadar, passing near the port towns of Ormara and Pasni.

Ustad Abdul Ghani Musical Academy

Ostaad Abdul Ghani Baloch Musical Academy has been running since 1992, located in Mauripur Village, a town, which is located on Hawkesbay Road. The academy was established by Ostaad Abdul Ghani Baloch, who can sing in Balochi, Sindhi, Urdu, Hindi and Saraiki. He teaches students about music and singing. He is a respected person in the area. He is a popular person too in his area. He has many students who have been singing in different areas in Karachi and Balochistan. Ostaad Abdul Ghani Baloch has been taught by Ostaad Mir Ahmed Baloch, who was very famous singer and music director.

See also
 Mauripur Expressway

References

External links 
 Karachi Website

Neighbourhoods of Karachi
Kiamari Town